Skinwalker Ranch (marketed in the UK as Skinwalkers) is a 2013 American found footage science fiction horror film directed by Devin McGinn and by Steve Berg. The movie had a video on demand and limited theatrical release on October 30, 2013, and stars Taylor Bateman, Steve Berg, and Michael Black. It is loosely based upon folklore surrounding the titular Utah-based Skinwalker Ranch, which is rumored to be the site of several UFO sightings.

Synopsis
Strange occurrences have been happening on the Skinwalker Ranch, which have culminated in the disappearance of the ranch owner's son. This prompts the dispatch of an investigative team to document the activity and look into the boy's disappearance by way of cameras set up throughout the ranch. The cameras record a series of increasingly eerie events and a warning by a Native American man, who tells the crew that their lives are in danger.

Cast
 Taylor Bateman as Rebecca
 Steve Berg as Sam
 Michael Black as Britton Sloan
 Erin Cahill as Lisa
 Carol Call as Lissie Miller
 Kyle Davis as Ray Reed
 Mike Flynn as Interviewee
 Jon Gries as Hoyt
 Michael Horse as Ahote
 Nash Lucas as Cody
 Devin McGinn as Cameron Murphy
 Matthew Rocheleau as Matt
 Anne Sward as Interviewee
 Tobijah Tyler as Interviewee
 Clint Vanderlinden as Interviewee
 Larry Page, appearing anonymously

Reception
Common criticism of the film centered on the plot, which Shock Till You Drop considered to be due to the over familiarity of films of this nature and of movies purported to be based on true events. The Salt Lake Tribune gave a positive review for Skinwalker Ranch, praising the movie's visual-effects work. Dan Callahan of RogerEbert.com gave a mixed review, remarking that "There is no point in Skinwalker Ranch when it seems as if this could actually be found footage, but it does garner a few scares and even a few honest laughs in its rather short running time. If you're looking for a neat little Halloween movie, you could do worse."

References

External links
 
 

American science fiction horror films
2010s science fiction horror films
2013 films
2013 horror films
Alien abduction films
Films set on farms
Films set in Utah
Films shot in Utah
UFO-related films
Found footage films
2010s English-language films
2010s American films